Bradley Ernest Whitford (born February 23, 1952) is an American musician who is best known for serving as the rhythm guitarist for the hard rock band Aerosmith for which he was inducted into the Rock and Roll Hall of Fame in 2001. He has also worked as a songwriter for the group, co-composing well-received tracks such as 1976's "Last Child".

Career 
Whitford graduated from Reading Memorial High School in 1970. After attending the Berklee College of Music, Whitford played in local bands Cymbals of Resistance, Teapot Dome, Earth, Inc., and finally a band called Justin Thyme before joining Aerosmith in 1971, replacing original guitarist Ray Tabano. Aerosmith would go on to be one of the most successful bands of the 1970s. However, following a string of less successful albums in the late 1970s, Whitford left the band in 1981 to work on his own project with singer Derek St. Holmes, simply called Whitford/St. Holmes. The project was dissolved after a sole self-titled album was released in 1981, although Whitford/St. Holmes reunited for a 2015 tour, at which a follow up album titled Reunion was sold.

Whitford briefly toured with the Joe Perry Project, featuring former Aerosmith bandmate Joe Perry, before both Perry and Whitford rejoined Aerosmith in 1984.  In the mid-late 1980s, all band members completed drug rehabilitation, including Whitford, who completed programs to combat his alcohol abuse.  Whitford remains sober to this day and continues to be an active member in Aerosmith.

Whitford also served as a producer for a well-known Boston band, the Neighborhoods, who were led by a rabid Aerosmith fan, David Minehan. When, in 1994, Whitford was forced to leave unexpectedly in the middle of an Asian tour due to family illness, Minehan was flown to Japan where he performed in Whitford's place for several days until Whitford returned.

Whitford missed the start of Aerosmith's 2009 summer tour after requiring surgery as a result of a head injury sustained while getting out of his Ferrari, joining the tour after a month.

In 2010, Whitford was announced as one of the guitarists to take part in the Experience Hendrix tour, playing songs performed and inspired by Jimi Hendrix along with other musicians such as Joe Satriani, Sacred Steel, Jonny Lang, Eric Johnson, Kenny Wayne Shepherd, Ernie Isley, Living Colour, Hubert Sumlin, Chris Layton, and bassist Billy Cox.

Along with fellow Aerosmith guitarist Joe Perry, Whitford was included in the Guitar World book The 100 Greatest Guitarists of All Time in 2007.

In November 2015, Whitford/St. Holmes reunited for a 10 show tour.

Musical contributions and style 
While Joe Perry is Aerosmith's better known guitarist and the band's principal songwriter with Steven Tyler, Whitford has made significant contributions to the band's repertoire over the years. This includes co-writing Aerosmith's hit "Last Child"  as well as some of Aerosmith's heaviest songs: "Nobody's Fault" and "Round and Round", and playing lead guitar on "Sick as a Dog" and "Back In the Saddle" (on which Perry plays six string bass), "Last Child", and on the ballads "You See Me Crying" and "Home Tonight", "Lord of the Thighs" and "Love in an Elevator". The version of "Lord of the Thighs" on their 1978 live album Live! Bootleg in particular is perhaps his most famous soloing moment.  When Aerosmith made their comeback in the late 1980s, Whitford continued to co-write tracks such as "Permanent Vacation" and "Hoodoo/Voodoo Medicine Man", and plays occasional lead guitar on some more recent tracks as well as during many live performances.

Concerning his lesser role in the band's songwriting process, Whitford has said, "I don't consider myself a terribly prolific writer. I can write music with other people if they're better songwriters than I am. I really can't create a song. It's very difficult to do. That's why the people that can do it are very few and far between. I'm certainly not that type of a guy. More of a guitar player, more of the kind of [guy] who comes up with enough riffs and ideas to write a song. But to write lyrics and come up with a melody for it, it won't happen."

Said Aerosmith lead singer Steven Tyler of the two guitarists, "Joe is self-taught and his playing comes from raw emotion. Not that Brad's doesn't, but his style is more schooled."

Slash, lead guitarist of Guns N' Roses cites Whitford as one of his heaviest influences, stating: "I identified with Joe Perry's image, both soundwise and visually....but I was also totally into Brad Whitford's guitar solos, and he had a more direct influence on the way I play than anybody realizes."

Lead guitar on Aerosmith records 

Brad Whitford plays lead guitar, co-leads, or plays the guitar solo on the following Aerosmith songs.
"Make It" from (co-lead) Aerosmith
"One Way Street" (co-lead, first guitar solo) from Aerosmith
"Lord of the Thighs" (lead) from Get Your Wings
"Spaced" from (co-lead) Get Your Wings
"S.O.S. (Too Bad)" from Get Your Wings
"Seasons of Wither" (co-lead, second guitar solo) from Get Your Wings
"Round and Round" from Toys in the Attic
"You See Me Crying" (co-lead, first and outro solo) from Toys in the Attic
"Back in the Saddle" (co-lead) from Rocks
"Last Child" from Rocks
"Sick as a Dog" (co-lead, first guitar solo) from Rocks
"Nobody's Fault" from Rocks
"Home Tonight" (co-lead, first solo) from Rocks
"I Wanna Know Why" from Draw the Line
"Kings and Queens" from Draw the Line
"The Hand that Feeds" from Draw the Line
"Milk Cow Blues" (co-lead and first guitar solo) from Draw the Line
"No Surprize" (co-lead) from Night in the Ruts
"Remember (Walking in the Sand) (co-lead) from Night in the Ruts
"Mia" (co-lead) from Night in the Ruts
"Shela" (co-lead) from Done with Mirrors
"Gypsy Boots" (co-lead) from Done with Mirrors
"She's on Fire" (co-lead) from Done with Mirrors
"The Hop" (co-lead) from Done with Mirrors
"Hearts Done Time" (co-lead) from Permanent Vacation
"Dude (Looks Like a Lady)" (co-lead, second guitar solo) from Permanent Vacation
"Girl Keeps Coming Apart" from Permanent Vacation
"Permanent Vacation" from Permanent Vacation
"The Movie" from Permanent Vacation
"Love in an Elevator" (co-lead) from Pump
"Hoodoo/Voodoo Medicine Man" from Pump
"Krawhitham" from Pandora's Box
"Fever" from Get a Grip
"Flesh" (co-lead, first guitar solo) from Get a Grip
"Gotta Love It" (co-lead, first guitar solo) from Get a Grip
"Can't Stop Messin'" (co-lead, second guitar solo)) from "Livin' on the Edge" single
"Nine Lives" from Nine Lives
"Ain't That a Bitch" from Nine Lives
"Crash" (co-lead) from Nine Lives
"Road Runner" (co-lead) from Honkin' on Bobo
"You Gotta Move" (co-lead) from Honkin' on Bobo
"I'm Ready" (co-lead, first guitar solo) from Honkin' on Bobo
"Stop Messin' Around" (co-lead, first guitar solo) from Honkin' on Bobo
"Beautiful" from Music from Another Dimension!
"Tell Me" from Music from Another Dimension!
"Street Jesus" (co-lead, first guitar solo) from Music from Another Dimension!
"Can't Stop Lovin' You" from Music from Another Dimension!

Aerosmith songs co-written by Whitford 
The following Aerosmith songs have a co-writing credit given to Brad Whitford
 "Round and Round" from Toys in the Attic
 "Last Child" from Rocks
 "Nobody's Fault" from Rocks
 "Kings and Queens" from Draw the Line
 "The Hand That Feeds" from Draw the Line
 "Shela" from Done with Mirrors
 "The Hop" from Done with Mirrors
 "Permanent Vacation" from Permanent Vacation
 "The Movie" from Permanent Vacation
 "Hoodoo/ Voodoo Medicine Man" from Pump
 "Krawhitham" from Pandora's Box
 "Soul Saver" from Pandora's Box
 "Circle Jerk" from Pandora's Box
 "Beautiful" from Music from Another Dimension!
 "Street Jesus" from Music from Another Dimension!
 "Lover Alot" from Music from Another Dimension!
 "Can't Stop Lovin' You" from Music from Another Dimension!

Equipment 
At current performances, Whitford can be seen playing a wide array of solid-body guitars, some including Floyd Rose locking tremolos: Gretschs, several Floyd Rose Discovery Series guitars, a Shoreline Gold painted (Stratocaster style) Melancon Pro Artist, a Gibson Les Paul Goldtop along with a wide variety of Fender Stratocasters. Whitford continues to tour primarily with vintage Fender Stratocasters and Gibson Les Pauls for Aerosmith concerts as well as smaller gigs.

Meanwhile, Aerosmith's original heyday in the late 1970s saw both Whitford and co-guitarist Joe Perry arm themselves with aggressive-looking guitars from BC Rich (Whitford favored an unpainted BC Rich Eagle, while Perry often played an alien-looking red BC Rich Bich).

On the amplifier front, Whitford has created his own amplifier company – 3 Monkeys Amplification and tours with many of their products. Furthermore, he also uses Paul Reed Smith amps. Additionally, Whitford has used a myriad of pedals throughout his career including many boutique ones.

Guest appearances 
Whitford appears in Guitar Hero: Aerosmith as the guitarist. He is also a playable character.
In 2011 Whitford made a guest appearance on A&Es Storage Wars episode "Hang 'Em High Desert" along with collector Barry Weiss appraising two vintage guitars and an amp
In 2012 Whitford contributed to Joe Bonamassa's album Driving Towards the Daylight on several tracks.
In 2019, Whitford made an appearance, along with his son Graham, in an episode of American Pickers where Mike and Frank find the original Aerosmith van (Season 20, episode 8)

References 

1952 births
Living people
Aerosmith members
Berklee College of Music alumni
American heavy metal guitarists
Guitarists from Massachusetts
Rhythm guitarists
People from Winchester, Massachusetts
American male guitarists
American rock guitarists
20th-century American guitarists
Hollywood Vampires (band) members
Glam metal musicians
Blues rock musicians